Cichla monoculus, sometimes known as the tucanare peacock bass ("peacock bass" is also used for some of its relatives), is a very large species of cichlid, and a prized game fish. It is native to the Amazon basin in South America, but has also been introduced to regions outside its natural range (e.g., Florida and Hawaii).

References

monoculus
Cichlid fish of South America
Freshwater fish of Brazil
Freshwater fish of Colombia
Freshwater fish of Peru
Fish of the Amazon basin
Fish described in 1831
Taxa named by Louis Agassiz